Anachalcos convexus is a species of scarab beetle in the genus Anachalcos.

The sequence of images shows a sequence of the beetle rolling a dung ball. It does this to navigate.

References

Deltochilini